The 1868 Massachusetts gubernatorial election was held on November 3.

Governor Alexander Bullock did not run for re-election to a fourth term. William Clafin was elected to succeed him over Democrat John Quincy Adams II.

Republican nomination

Candidates
William Claflin, Lieutenant Governor
George B. Loring, State Representative from Salem

Results
At the Worcester convention on September 9, Benjamin F. Butler withdrew Loring's name from contention and Claflin was nominated by acclamation.

General election

Candidates
John Quincy Adams II, former State Representative from Quincy
William Claflin, Lieutenant Governor and Chairman of the Republican National Committee (Republican)

Results

See also
 1868 Massachusetts legislature

References

Governor
1868
Massachusetts
November 1868 events